Raquel Garza is a Mexican actress and comedian.

Personal life 
She is married and has twins

Filmography

References

External links 
 

1967 births
Living people
Mexican television actresses
21st-century Mexican actresses
Actresses from Tamaulipas